The Fengping River is a tributary of the Xiuguluan River in Taiwan. It flows through Hualien County for 19 km before joining Xiuguluan River in Yuli, Hualien.

See also
List of rivers in Taiwan

References

Rivers of Taiwan
Landforms of Hualien County